The Ilme is a left-bank, western tributary of the River Leine in Lower Saxony, Germany.

See also
List of rivers of Lower Saxony

References

Rivers of Lower Saxony
Solling
Special Protection Areas
Rivers of Germany